Defending champion Dylan Alcott defeated Sam Schröder in the final, 6–2, 6–2 to win the quad singles wheelchair tennis title at the 2021 Wimbledon Championships. It was the third step towards an eventual Golden Slam for Alcott, and he completed the double career Grand Slam with the win.

Seeds

Draw

Finals

References

Sources
WC Quad Singles

Quad Wheelchair Singles